USCGC Cheyenne is a Gasconade-class  river buoy tender which was built in 1966 at Tell City, Indiana by Maxon Construction Co. Upon commissioning she was assigned a homeport of Leavenworth, Kansas.

Design
Cheyenne pushes a specific-use  aid to navigation maintenance barge, with a crane and buoy service gear. The vessel has a  beam,  of draft, and displaces 141 tons (full load).

History 
Cheyenne was initially assigned a homeport at Leavenworth, Kansas, in 1966 but was transferred to Coast Guard Base St. Louis, Missouri, in 1970. Since the Great Flood of 1993, she has been homeported at the foot of Arsenal Street in St. Louis. She is commanded by a master chief boatswain's mate with a crew of thirteen assigned. Her area of operation includes the upper Mississippi River mile marker 109.9 at Chester, Illinois, to mile 200.8 at Alton, Illinois; the Missouri River mile marker 0.0 at St. Louis, Missouri, to mile 226.3 at Glasgow, Missouri; and the Kaskaskia River at mile marker 0.0 to mile 28.5 at New Athens, Illinois.

Citations

Bibliography

External links
  World navies of Today specifications for Gasconade-class tug-type river buoy tenders

Gasconade-class buoy tenders
Ships of the United States Coast Guard
1966 ships
Ships built in Indiana